The 1909 West Virginia Mountaineers football team was an American football team that represented West Virginia University as an independent during the 1909 college football season. In its second season under head coach Charles Augustus Lueder, the team compiled a 4–3–2 record and outscored opponents by a total of 118 to 81. Lee Hutchinson was the team captain.

Schedule

References

West Virginia
West Virginia Mountaineers football seasons
West Virginia Mountaineers football